Alvin Community College (ACC)  is a public community college in Alvin, Texas. Alvin Community College provides educational opportunities in workforce training, academics, technical fields, adult basic education, and personal development.

As defined by the Texas Legislature, the official service area of ACC is  the following:
all territory within the Alvin, Danbury, and Pearland school districts, and
that portion of the Angleton Independent School District annexed by ACC prior to September 1, 1995.

Areas within the ACC taxation zone include: Alvin, Hillcrest, Iowa Colony, Manvel, and portions of Pearland.

Academics
Alvin Community College offers degrees in Associate of Applied Science (AAS), Associate of Arts (AA), and Associate of Science (AS), as well as many certificate programs. ACC participates in the Texas Common Course Numbering System, or TCCNS, a voluntary cooperative effort by many Texas colleges and universities to create a standard set of course designations for transfer students at the freshman and sophomore level. This allows students to take classes which will transfer to a university. ACC Department of Continuing Education and Workforce Development also offers a variety of programs that allow students to further or begin new careers in a number of fields including health care, professional services, industrial arts and more.

Campuses
ACC's main campus is located at 3110 Mustang Road in Alvin. In addition, a museum devoted to the baseball career of Alvin's most famous resident, Nolan Ryan, is located on the ACC main campus. Ryan studied at ACC, then known as Alvin Junior College, during a few off-seasons early in his career.

ACC opened a Pearland College Center in 1998 and offered college courses at this location for 15 years. In the spring of 2013, ACC officials announced that the Pearland College Center would close by June and that the center would be sold. The move was prompted by decreasing enrollment figures at the center and by new agreements that had been established with Turner College and Career High School in Pearland Independent School District.

Notable alumni
Randy Weber, member of the United States Congress.
Nolan Ryan, former MLB hall of fame pitcher

References

External links

Official website

 
Two-year colleges in the United States
Educational institutions established in 1948
Education in Brazoria County, Texas
Universities and colleges accredited by the Southern Association of Colleges and Schools
Community colleges in Texas
Buildings and structures in Brazoria County, Texas
1948 establishments in Texas